Weekender is a Queensland-based lifestyle program screening on Sundays at 5:30pm.

Production 
Queensland Weekender began in 2003 on the Seven Network on Saturdays at 5:30pm. It was produced by 7 Productions Queensland and often aired alongside similarly themed Queensland lifestyle programs, Creek To Coast and The Great South East. 

In November 2019, the Seven Network announced the show had been axed with the final episodes screening in early 2020. In January 2020, Seven announced Weekender, an amalgamated version of Queensland Weekender and The Great Day Out, would begin from February 9, 2020 on Sundays at 5:30pm.

See also
 Sydney Weekender
 Melbourne Weekender
 WA Weekender
 SA Weekender

References

External links 
 Official website

Seven Network original programming
Australian non-fiction television series
Australian travel television series
2003 Australian television series debuts
Television shows set in Queensland